The Tommy Steele Story is a 1957 British film directed by Gerard Bryant and starring Tommy Steele, dramatising Steele's rise to fame as a teen idol. Along with Rock You Sinners, it was one of the first British films to feature rock and roll. In the US, where Steele was not well-known, the film was released under the title Rock Around the World. The film was announced in January 1957, three months after the release of Steele's first single "Rock with the Caveman".

Plot
Tommy Steele lives with his mother and father in their London home. He works with a bellboy until he injures his spine doing judo. In hospital he is given a guitar to help with his therapy and he starts to play to entertain patients and staff. He works on an ocean liner, performing in his spare time, and gets a job playing in a coffee bar. He is popular with audiences and gets a recording contract.

Cast
Tommy Steele as himself
Chas McDevitt Skiffle Group
Nancy Whiskey
Humphrey Lyttelton & his Band
Tommy Eytle's Calypso Band
Chris O'Brien's Caribbeans ('The Caribbean' Club Band)
The Steelmen
Hilda Fenemore as Mrs Steele
Charles Lamb as Mr Steele

Production
Steele was approached to make the film by Nat Cohen and Stuart Levy. He later wrote in his memoirs, "They were quite different from that other British film mogul, J. Arthur Rank. Where Rank was C. Aubrey Smith, Cohen and Levy were Abbott and Costello. They didn't so much as hold a meeting as do an act." He added "there was a degree of madness about them – but you had to be mad to take the chances they took – with a little eccentricity for good measure."

Steele agreed to do the film. He met with Mike Pratt and Lionel Bart and they spent a month writing the songs.  Two weeks later the film was shot. Bart considered the film premature, reflecting "Here's this guy, he's only 20, he ain't even started his story". He was paid £3,000 for the lead role.

Norman Hudis was hired to write the script by Peter Rodgers. Hudis did it in ten days saying "it was one of the easiest I've ever done" as "I was a cockney like Tommy Steele. I came from the same sort of street: I knew how he talked. I knew how he thought." Hudis felt it "was an astute and alert move to make the subject but at most I thought it would be a sterling support film. The success of the film and the way it rocketed to first feature status knocked me for six."

Steele says director Gerald Bryant "was more like a poet than a showman."

Reception
According to Kinematograph Weekly the film was "in the money" at the British box office in 1957. According to another account, The Tommy Steele Story was the 13th most popular film at the British box office in 1957. Steele was voted the seventh most popular star in Britain for that year. In 1959, The Tommy Steele Story became one of the few British films shown in the Soviet Union after Steele made a three-day promotional visit to Moscow for a screening at the Kremlin.

The Tommy Steele Story received a generally positive critical reception. Writing in Melody Maker, Tony Brown deemed Steele "a natural", commenting "he can amble in front of the cameras cocking a snook at RADA technique and still go over with a bang". Brown criticised the film's plot as having "no dramatic impact. Every thing, it seems, happened so easily", but praised the film's production value and concluded "it must be counted as a triumph for the Bermondsey boy. There should be a few red faces along Tin Pan Alley when it goes the rounds". An uncredited writer for Bristol Evening Post praised Steele's performance in an "engaging" film that "could so easily have been embarrassing to anyone not addicted to the youth"

Soundtrack

The Tommy Steele Story is the first soundtrack album and the second album release by Tommy Steele, issued as a 10-inch LP by Decca in May 1957. The album's twelve songs were composed quickly by Lionel Bart and Mike Pratt, with Steele co-writing all but one. The soundtrack features a broader range of genres than Steele's previous releases, with Bart having convinced Norman Hudis that "they couldn't all be rock and roll songs if they were doing [Tommy's] story. He's a cockney kid, he's been in the merchant navy, so let's have some cockney songs, and let's have some calypso."

The soundtrack album was the first UK number one album by a British act. Its two singles, "Butterfingers" and the double A-side "Water, Water" / "A Handful of Songs", were both top-ten hits on the UK Singles Chart. In 1958, "A Handful of Songs" received the Ivor Novello Award for Most Outstanding Song of the Year, Musically and Lyrically. Tim Rice has described the song as "a lovely composition, a show song disguised as a pop song and it showed the way both of them were heading."

Track listing 
Side one
 "Take Me Back, Baby" – 2:04
 "Butterfingers" – 2:20
 "I Like" – 1:43
 "A Handful of Songs" – 2:07
 "You Gotta Go" – 3:19
 "Water, Water" – 2:19
 "Cannibal Pot" – 1:55

Side two
 "Will It Be You" – 2:09
 "Two Eyes" – 1:46
 "Build Up" – 2:24
 "Time to Kill" – 2:00
 "Elevator Rock" – 1:51
 "Doomsday Rock" – 2:01
 "Teenage Party" – 2:22

Notes

References

Notes

External links

The Tommy Steele Story at BFI Screenonline

1957 films
British black-and-white films
British biographical films
British rock music films
Films set in the 1950s
Films produced by Herbert Smith (producer)
Films with screenplays by Norman Hudis
1950s English-language films
1950s British films